Balran is a village of Sub division Moonak in Sangrur district in the state of Punjab, India. It is 54 km to the south of district headquarters Sangrur and 157 km from state capital Chandigarh. This village is near the border of the Sangrur district and Fatehabad district in state of Haryana.

Geography
It has an average elevation of 227 metres.

Demographics
 India census, Balran had a population of 6,566. The male population was 3,542 and female population was 3,022. There were 1,111 households.

References

Villages in Sangrur district